Nowadays, no one could still claim his pure race status. Ethnic, social and linguistic differences become each day more and more present and marked all over the world. Time, history and continuous population intermingling across boundaries led to create cosmopolitan beings, that is to say world citizens who, in spite of their singularity, manage to bring themselves together in order to create a unique and single nation. Among the nations most affected by this cross-fertilization is notably found Mauritius. The social and linguistic diversity of this country makes it unique and contribute to its wealth. It arouses curiosity, urges us to deepen our knowledge on the subject and is, to this extent, worth being studied.

History and linguistic consequences

Discovery of the island 

Mauritius was first discovered by Arab sailors during the 5th century. The island was rediscovered by the Portuguese during the 16th century. At the same time, the latter also noticed the existence of other territories located in the Pacific Ocean, near Madagascar. Nevertheless, this new territorial awareness did not urge the Portuguese to settle in the newly discovered islands so that this geographical area will only be exploited later on to become a series of international centres where different ethnic groups will meet and therefore create a new heterogeneous culture. In the 17th century, the Dutch and the French began to develop an interest for these new territories. This interest was motivated by strategic and commercial reasons though they failed in their attempt to colonize the previously mentioned area. Indeed, the Dutch left the island in 1710 after having honoured their Prince, Maurice of Nassau, by naming the island Mauritius. With the arrival of the French, this denomination will be replaced by Île de France.

The island as a French colony 

The first French colonists arrived in Mauritius in 1721 and decided to settle for strategic reasons. Indeed, they used the island as a military and commercial cornerstone because, at this time of the history, the French had in mind to conquer India and expand the spice trade. Mauritius was therefore useful as a port of call since it gave the French the opportunity to obtain fresh supplies and rest from their long journey. Gradually, the French will call in slaves mainly coming from Africa, Madagascar, Mozambique, and India in order to build a large harbour in Mauritius. This interaction between French and African people will then lead to the creation of a pidgin, that is to say, a language that is only used by populations of distinct origins as a means of communication. A pidgin, by definition, isn't the mother tongue of any community but rather emerges from the interaction of each language spoken by each distinct community. When a pidgin becomes further used by new generations as a mother tongue, it loses its name of pidgin and begins to be called Creole. As the consequence of the French colonization, the Creole still spoken nowadays in Mauritius has French roots. Moreover, from this time on, the country will remain well influenced by the French culture, its language and its religion.  A great number of Indians will incidentally convert to Christianity.  The Indo-Mauritians who adopted a French culture at this point of the history will be considered as Creoles, as opposed to the Indo-Mauritians who will settle in the island much later.

The island as a British colony 

In 1810, the island becomes British. The new colonizers will give it back its former name of Mauritius and will carry out various important changes even though they will allow Creoles to keep their culture, religion (mostly Christianity), laws, and property. First, they will develop the exploitation of sugar cane, what will better the economic status of the island. Then, the island will know a big improvement in the field of human rights with abolition of slavery in 1835. As a consequence of this important change, a noticeable number of Indians and Chinese will emigrate to the island and become indentured labourers or shopkeepers. The emergence of new ethnic communities will enhance the Mauritian culture in so far as it will increase the number of languages spoken throughout the territory. Among these new languages are Bhojpuri (spoken by Indians coming from Bihar), Hindi, Urdu, Tamil, Telugu (languages spoken by Indians coming from Madras), Marathi (spoken by populations coming from Bombay), Hakka Chinese and Cantonese (varieties of Chinese). Moreover, at this time, the English language is used in the administration at the expense of the French one.  Nevertheless, the English people settled in the island tended to adopt the French culture and the Franco-Mauritians’ language and will only try to promote their own language during the 19th century.

The island as an independent state

Politics and economy 

In 1968, Mauritius becomes an independent state even though it still belongs to the Commonwealth of Nations. The island only becomes a Republic in 1992. The economy of the land is no more limited to the exploitation of sugar cane and one begins to rely on new resources such as industry, tourism, capital market. In 2001, the island counts 1 185 000 inhabitants. This population is composed of 68% of Indians  (Tamils, Telugus, Marathis), 30% of General Population (28% of Creoles and 2% of Whites) and 2% of Chinese. These heterogeneous communities cohabit rather pacifically although discrimination and racism towards some cultures still exist today

Linguistic communities 

In Mauritius, the political organization is divided into four linguistic communities among which are Hindus, Muslims, Sino-Mauritians, and the General Population. Contrarily to the two other communities, Hindu and Muslim communities differ from the others because of their belonging to a religious – and not ethnic – group.

Indo-Mauritians

Hindus and Muslims belong to the Indo-Mauritian group since they both are communities coming from India.  Some Indians only speak Bhojpuri and know only little Hindi and Urdu in spite of the fact that its knowledge could be an important asset in international trade, these two languages being respectively the official languages of India and Pakistan.

Hindus
It is the community that is composed of Bhojpuris, Marathis, Telugus, Tamils, Gujaratis, and Sindhis.

Muslims

Among Muslims there are Biharis, Gujaratis, and Kutchis.

Sino-Mauritians

Hakka Chinese and Cantonese belong to the Sino-Mauritian community. They mainly come from Guandgong (formerly Cantonese), from the South of China, from Singapore and Penang.

The general population

The General Population is made out of White people, Franco-Mauritians (descendant of colonizers), and Creoles. Nevertheless, the denomination Creole still has a pejorative connotation and still carries the idea of lower social class. It is the reason why some people prefer to use the terminology Persons of Color to designate the General Population.

Interactions between communities

Most people belonging to a same ethnic group, a same social class and having a same origin tend to live in a same area, which is not problematic since the roads are well developed in the whole island. Therefore, it is easy to move from one to the other extreme of the Mauritian territory. Thanks to the important development of roads, little villages are as well accessible as bigger cities.

Most Hindus prefer to live in the country whereas other Indo-Mauritians – Muslims – prefer more urbanized areas. The population found in the capital and in urbanized zones is mostly the Sino-Mauritian population and the General Population.

Religions practiced in each community

Each community is different from another from its particularities, culture, language and religion. It is the reason why so many distinct religions are spoken throughout the island. The four most developed religions are Hinduism, Islam, Catholicism and Buddhism. They are mostly practiced respectively by Hindus, Muslims, the General Population and Sino-Mauritians.

Languages in use

Languages of worship

At first, Mauritius was an empty island where little by little, people settled. As they did so, everyone came in with their culture, language and religious identity.  This is what explains the multicultural status of island and the existence of so many worships in such a small territory. Each religion brought by each community is still practiced in the language spoken by this community or at least in the original language in which this particular religion was practiced.

Hindus use Hindi, Telugu, Tamil, and Marathi in their worship. Most here Telugu is used as third language here over 30000 Telugu people are living with their unforgettable traditions. Even though Bhojpuri is a language well used by Hindus in their daily life, it is not used as a language of worship because of its spoken status which confer it its unworthiness.

Muslims read the Koran in Arabic but the imam communicates with his congregation in Urdu or in Gujarati.

As far as Buddhists are concerned, the language used in the practice of their worship is the Chinese. Finally, the Catholics mainly use the French language in their cult since Creole as the same kind of negative connotation as Bhojpuri which is considered as an unworthy language. Therefore, Creole is only used by clergymen when directly addressing to the audience (when telling sermons for instance).

Official language

The only official language of Mauritius is English, which is consequently the language of administration. Nevertheless, French is spoken at the Assembly and by the deputies of the General Population. It is also necessary to mention the difference between oral and written use of the language. Official documents are redacted in English whereas French and Creole are accepted when addressing the population. Indeed, by using the Creole language, the members of the administration make sure that everyone understands what is being said. It is incidentally used during the elections. Indian and Chinese languages are not really used by the state except when a politician directly targets a specific community. In this case, Hindi and Bhojpuri could for example be used.

Languages of the media

French is the language most used in the media even though it is rather frequent to come across English headlines in the newspapers. Moreover, English can also be found in British or American press as well as in government communications although comments and conclusions raised at the legislative Assembly are usually translated into French. Creole also appears in the media, more specifically in humorous or parodic quotes and in left-wing press. In this field, the least represented languages are the Indian and Chinese languages even though Hindustani – a word referring to Hindi and Urdu as spoken languages – is quite used in the Indian and Pakistani cinema.

Publishing languages

Contrarily to many countries in which most books are written and published in the official language of the specific territory, Mauritius works differently. First, it is important to differentiate the different types of books existing. Literature is often written in French whereas one usually deals with scientific and technical works in English since English is the language used in academic education and research studies. As far as Indo-Mauritians are concerned, only books of religious or didactical nature are written. At the present time, few works are redacted in Creole, Bhojpuri and Hindi despite the fact that there is a rising number of published documents written in English and Hindi.

Languages in the advertisement

As far as advertising is concerned, the three languages most used are French, English and Creole. The choice of one language rather than another depends on the commercialized product and on the public targeted. Moreover, a frequent diglossia is noticeable, on the one hand between French and English and on the other hand between French and Creole. It is the reason why it sometimes happens that a catch-phrase should begin in a language and end in another one.

Languages of the education

In Mauritius, there is a specific tutorial system. Usually, children first go to primary school and it is compulsory. The latter consists of six years of study after which children should take and pass their “School Certificate” to have access to secondary school. Five years later, children are supposed to receive their “Cambridge Higher School Certificate” (HSC) and if they want to go on with their studies they then go to college where seven years of study are needed to obtain a master's degree.

From their first year of primary school on, children learn both English and French which is compulsory. English and French are two compulsory languages which are taught up to the level of Cambridge School Certificate (SC). Since 1955, Chinese and Indian students attend classes dedicated to the learning of their culture and ancestral language so that they learn a third language in addition to the two other languages mentioned above. Meanwhile, Catholic Creoles go to their catechism class.

Chinese children don't learn, contrarily to what one could think, Hakka or Cantonese which are their mother tongue or at least the mother tongue of their ancestors but rather Mandarin which is the most spoken language in China. The knowledge of this language is a major asset since it is an international language pretty useful in international trading. (Cantonese is also pretty useful in international trade.)

As for the Indians, they have the opportunity to choose to learn one Indian language according to their origins. Most primarily school propose to teach Hindi, Tamil, Urdu, Telugu and Marathi. All these languages have a same Indian origin but are nevertheless very different from one another and some of them incidentally use different alphabet in their writing. For instance, Hindi uses the Devanagari alphabet whereas the writing of Urdu requests an Arab alphabet even though both languages are quite similar orally. They only acquired their respective particularities because of cultural and religious differences in which each of them was independently used. Indeed, Hindi is the language of Hindus whereas Urdu is the language of Muslims. The only Indian language not proposed in primary school is Bhojpuri. The reason for that is the fact that only few students are interested in learning it. Moreover, Bhojpuri is considered as a spoken language and is only used on paper in traditional and popular poetry because of its negative connotation compared to Hindu or Urdu which are a lot more prestigious. This prestige probably comes from the international status of these two languages, contrarily to Bhojpuri which is only used locally since Mauritian Bhojpuri is quite different from the one currently spoken in India. Effectively, Indians coming from Calcutta used different dialects which, as time went by, became unified to form Mauritian Bhojpuri. Considering this whole point, we can conclude that the Indians and the Chinese are then dedicated to becoming cosmopolitan beings.

Since 1944, the language of education is officially English - at the expense of French – excepted in languages classes in which lessons are given in the language being learnt. Nevertheless, Creole is still used by some teachers as an understanding tool.  The use of the Mauritians’ mother tongue allows the latter to diminish the number of potential confusions and misunderstandings of the material being taught. To make sure that everyone understand perfectly what a specific lesson deals with, many teachers answer to questions in Creole and repeat a same piece of information twice: once in English and once in Creole.

Conclusion
Mauritius, an island located in the Indian Ocean and eastward from Africa, is a multiethnic and multilingual country in which a great number of languages are known and spoken. The Mauritians are strongly interested in international languages to favour international trade and to crave out their niche in the world. It is incidentally one of the developing nations whose evolution is the most remarkable and impressive. Despite its desire of international interactions, Mauritius still remains strongly attached to its roots and wants to keep its cultural patrimony at all costs. The diversity of the island can, however, sometimes causes tensions and incomprehension between members of different communities, but it allows international relations and contributes above all to the wealth and the maintenance of Mauritian culture.

References

 Peter Stein, Connaissance et emploi des langues à l'Île Maurice (Buske Verlag, 1982).
 David Martial, Identité Et Politique Culturelle À L'île Maurice: Regards Sur Une Société Plurielle (Paris: L'Harmattan, 2002).
 Isabelle Widmer, La Réunion Et Maurice: Parcours De Deux Îles Australes Des Origines Au XXe Siècle (Paris: Institut national d'études démographiques, 2005).
 Atchia Emmerich, Bilkiss, “La situation linguistique à l'île Maurice. Les développements récents à la lumière d'une enquête empirique.” (Nuremberg, Allemagne: Friedrich-Alexander-Universität, 2005), http://www.opus.ub.uni-erlangen.de/opus/volltexte/2005/142/pdf/Doktorarbeit%2028.2.2005.pdf.
 Jacques Lemaire et al., Mélanges Offerts À Jacques Lemaire (Bruxelles: Presses Ferrer, 2002).

Languages of Mauritius